Campus SuperStar is a Singaporean television music competition to find new singing talent. Contestants are students from secondary schools, junior colleges and institutes of technical education. The third season began airing on MediaCorp Channel U on 4 January 2009 and ended on 12 April 2009. 

Jim Lim and Li Feihui were the two judges from the previous season to return, and was joined by Xiaohan and Ken Tay, who all appeared as judges for the first time. Previous judge Jimmy Ye declined to return. Pornsak, Felicia Chin and Lee Teng hosted the show, while Yuan Shuai was employed as the online correspondent. Yoga Lin, winner of the first season of One Million Star, was invited to be the ambassador of the show.

This was the first season to have a reduced number of finalists from 20 to 12, without equal gender representation (eight female finalists and four male finalists), and this season was also notable for being the only season in which the competition have two revival rounds, the 'immunity' and 'sudden-death' eliminations during performance show, an elimination-based sing-off, a non-Chinese contestant was a part of the top 12, and one male and three females represented in the finale, as opposed to two per gender on the past two seasons (the format also happened on the fourth season in 2013). 

The series was won by Jarod Lee, a thirteen-year-old student from Ngee Ann Secondary School, and won a two-year MediaCorp management contract and a cash prize of $2,000, beating Rachel Chua, a fourteen-year-old student from Anglican High School, who was also the first and only contestant to be eliminated and reinstated in the competition twice.

Judges and hosts
Jim Lim was confirmed to be returning to the judging panel after judging season two of the show. Li Feihui was also announced to return for this third year as a judge. Season two judge and vocal coach Jimmy Ye declined to return as a judge for the third season. It was announced that two new judges would be brought in to replace Ye on the judging panel. Award-winning lyricist Xiaohan and singer Ken Tay were instated as the third and fourth judge.

Season two host Pornsak returned to host the show. Former season two host Dasmond Koh left the show and his position was taken over by actress Felicia Chin and SuperHost runner-up Lee Teng. U Are the One winner Yuan Shuai hosted the online streaming programme as the show's social media correspondent, increasing the show's involvement with its fans and offering behind the scenes information and news.

Selection process

Applications and first auditions
The audition was opened to students studying in secondary schools, junior colleges or institutes of technical education in Singapore. Auditions in front of the judges for season 3 took place in MediaCorp on 8 and 9 November 2008. Applicants are to report to the venue for the audition in their respective school uniforms. Out of 2046 applicants, 141 were put through to the second round of the auditions.

Second auditions
Similar to the first auditions, the second auditions took place in MediaCorp on 15 November 2008. 107 contestants were eliminated at this stage of the competition, leaving 34 to compete in the final round of the auditions.

Third auditions
34 contestants competed at this stage of the competition on 24 November 2008. 22 contestants were eliminated and the remaining 12 were put through to the live shows as finalists. For the first time in Campus SuperStar history, the contestants do not have equal gender representation; eight females and four males advanced to the finals.

Finalists
Key:
 – Winner
 – Runner-up
 – Third place
 – Advanced via Revival
 – Advanced via Ultimate revival

Live shows
The live shows began on 12 January. Each week, the contestants' performances took place on Monday at 8:00pm and the results were announced on the same night at 11:30pm. As with previous seasons, each live show had a different theme. The results show often featured guest performances and sometimes a group performance by the remaining contestants.

On the first live show, sixth live results show and live final, One Million Star season one winner and the show's ambassador Yoga Lin performed. The first live show also featured performances by Singaporean band Mi Lu Bing and singer Olivia Ong. The fourth live results show included performance from One Million Star season 3 fifth runner-up Wong Jing Lun while Project SuperStar season one runner-up Kelly Poon performed on the fifth results show. Project SuperStar season one female runner-up Shi Xin Hui and Malaysian singer Fish Leong  performed on the seventh live result show. Project SuperStar season one male second runner-up Derrick Hoh performed on the eighth live results show, while Taiwanese hip hop band Da Mouth performed on the eleventh and thirteenth. The twelfth live results show and thirteenth live show included performance from Taiwanese boy band Fahrenheit. The eleventh and twelfth live shows also featured performance by Singaporean singer Jocie Kwok. Singaporean singer Meixin performed on the thirteenth live show as well. One Million Star season two runner-up Rachel Liang and the winner for the first season of Project SuperStar, Kelvin Tan performed for the live final.

Guest judging roles were brought in during the eighth, twelfth and thirteenth week of the live shows. Former Project SuperStar judge Dawn Yip attended the eighth live show, and Singaporean singer Maggie Theng attended the twelfth live show. Lee Wei Song, Kelvin Tan, Wu Jia Ming and Theng attended the thirteenth live show as guest judges as well.  During the twelfth week of the live shows, it was announced that judge Jim Lim was unable to present for the live shows due to work commitments in Taiwan with singer A-mei. During the week, it was announced that former judge Cavin Soh would replace him as a judge on the show.

Results summary
Colour key

Live show details

Week 1: Pre-show concert (4 January)
Theme: Alumni duets/trios
Group performance: "By Now"
Special performance: "只对你有感觉" (performed by Felicia Chin, Lee Teng, Pornsak and Yuan Shuai)
Musical guests: Season one and season two top 20 finalists featuring season three hosts and Euphoria Cheerleading Team ("CSS进行曲"), Mi Lu Bing ("世界麻烦借过一下"), Olivia Ong ("如燕") and Yoga Lin ("残酷月光" and "伯乐")
The top 12 finalists were revealed in this pre-recorded 2-hour special episode, featuring performances from the finalists together with former alumnus from the past seasons.

Week 2 (12 January)
Theme: Their representation songs
Sing-off song: "童话"
For the first six weeks of competition, contestants are split into two groups competing in one of the two weeks. This week's sing-off is the only time the elimination is decided by muting one of the microphones.

Week 3 (19 January)
Theme: Their representation songs
Sing-off song: "遗失的美好"
Similar to week 2, contestants compete in one of two groups performing the same theme. Beginning this week, the sing-off eliminates the contestant when their pitch was altered to a lowered pitch.

Week 4 (2 February)
Theme: Their favourite subjects
Musical guest: Wong Jing Lun ("月光" and "缺席")
Sing-off song: "天黑黑"

Week 5 (9 February)
Theme: Their favourite subjects
Musical guest: Kelly Poon ("本小姐不爱" and "限时的遗忘")
Sing-off song: "城里的月光"

Week 6 (16 February)
Theme: Songs for their teachers
Musical guest: Yoga Lin ("分享" with Ridhwan Azman, Rachael Chang, Benita Cheng, Jarod Lee, Rachel Lim, Joselin Ng, Jeremy Teng and Yap Jia Min; "爱情是圆的" and "病态")
Sing-off song: "安静"

Week 7 (23 February)
Theme: Songs for their teachers
Musical guests: Shi Xin Hui ("无能为力" and "你没想像中爱我") and Fish Leong ("没有如果")
Sing-off song: "记得"

Week 8: Revival round 1 (2 March)
Theme: Derrick Hoh's challenge (billed as "I want to challenge Derrick Hoh!")
Musical guest: Derrick Hoh ("咬字" and "很想你")
Sing-off songs: "朋友一生一起走" (remaining four singers) and "老鼠爱大米" (Chang and Li Li)
The six singers who were eliminated from the first six live shows returned to the stage to perform for the revival round. The contestant with the highest judges' score (above 39.0 points) would be immune from elimination (did not face the public vote) and was immediately reinstated from the competition. Of the remaining five contestants, the contestant with a higher combined total would also be reinstated from the competition. Former Project SuperStar judge Dawn Yip was brought in as the guest judge.

Week 9 (9 March)
Theme: Motivating drama theme songs
Sing-off song: "遇见"
Beginning this round, individual scores from the judges are no longer shown, as the scores are shown at the end of all the performances. Two contestants were eliminated from the season eighth live and result shows. The contestant with the lowest judges' score (below 26.0) would be immediately eliminated without facing the public votes. Of the remaining seven contestants, the contestant with a lower combined total will also be eliminated.

Week 10 (16 March)
Theme: Songs for their best friends
Sing-off song: "当你孤单你会想起谁"
Two contestants were eliminated from the season ninth live and result shows. The contestant with the lowest judges' score (below 28.0) would be immediately eliminated without facing the public votes. Of the remaining five contestants, the contestant with a lower combined total will also be eliminated. Beginning this round, the altered pitch during the sing-off is adjusted to a higher pitch.

Week 11: Semi-final (23 March)
Theme: Transmission of love
Musical guests: Jocie Kwok ("放了爱") and Da Mouth ("永远在身边")
Sing-off song: "勇气"
Two contestants were eliminated and one contestant would immediately advance to the finals from the season tenth live and result shows. The contestant with the lowest judges' score (below 30.0) would be immediately eliminated without facing the public votes, while the contestant receiving the highest judges' score (above 30.0) would be immune to elimination and immediately advanced to the finals. Of the two remaining contestants, the combined total determined which singer will advance to the final, and which singer was eliminated.

At the end of the results, each of the judges select one eliminated contestant from week 8 to 10 to compete in the Ultimate Revival Round next week; Li Li and Ridzwan were not chosen to compete round and both were permanently eliminated.

Week 12: Ultimate Revival Round 2 (30 March)
Theme: Judges' choice
Musical guests: Fahrenheit ("越来越爱" and "寂寞暴走") and Jocie Kwok ("许愿树")
Sing-off song: "我无所谓"
The contestant with the highest judges' score would be immune from elimination (did not face the public vote) and was immediately reinstated from the competition; of the remaining three contestants, the contestant with a higher combined total would also be reinstated from the competition. Lim did not appear on the judging panel for week 12 due to work commitments in Taiwan with singer A-mei; season one judge Cavin Soh took his place on the panel. Singer Maggie Theng was brought in as the guest judge as well.

Week 13: Final (6/12 April)
6 April (Prelude)
Musical guests: Da Mouth ("国王皇后"), Meixin ("孤单的人总说无所谓") and Fahrenheit ("默默")
All top 12 finalists returned to the stage in this pre-recorded non-elimination performance show. It featured group performances from the finalists as well as a look-back on their journey in the competition.

12 April (Round 1)
Themes: Alumni duets: oldies songs; contestant quartet: designated song
Group performance: "I'd Like to Teach the World to Sing (in Perfect Harmony)" (all finalists)
Musical guests: Rachel Liang ("最幸福的事" and "可以不爱了") and Kelvin Tan ("孤单好吗")
Project SuperStar season one winner Kelvin Tan, singer Maggie Theng, music producer and composer Lee Wei Song and Wu Jia Ming were brought in as the guest judges.

12 April (Round 2)
Theme: Winner's song
Musical guests: Yoga Lin ("伯乐" and "慢一点")
Sing-off song:  "Super Star"

References

External links
 Official website

2009 Singaporean television seasons